Sergei Ivanovich Skripka (October 5, 1949 in Kharkov) is a  Russian conductor, and a People's Artist of Russia, conductor of the State Symphony Cinema Orchestra.

Early life

Skripka graduated in 1972 from the Kharkov Institute of Arts as chorusmaster.

Conductor

After graduating from the Conservatoire in 1979, Skripka started to work with the Russian State Symphony Orchestra of Cinematography, and since 1993 he has been their Artistic Director and Chief Conductor.  Simultaneously Skripka has conducted the Zhukovsky Symphony Orchestra since 1979, with which he has toured Switzerland (in 1991) and Hungary (in 1998). 

Skripka speaks both German and English which facilitates his work with foreign orchestras.

References
 
  at Russian State Symphony Cinema Orchestra website
 Сlassica

1949 births
Living people
People's Artists of Russia
21st-century Russian conductors (music)
Russian male conductors (music)
21st-century Russian male musicians